Entertaining Mr Sloane is a 1970 British black comedy film directed by Douglas Hickox. The screenplay by Clive Exton is based on the 1964 play of the same title by Joe Orton. This was the second adaptation of the play, the first having been developed for British television and broadcast by ITV on 15 July 1968.

Plot
Murder, homosexuality, nymphomania, and sadism are among the themes of this black comedy focusing on a brother and sister who become involved with a young, sexy, amoral drifter with a mysterious past.

Kath is a lonely middle-aged woman living in the London suburbs with her aging father Kemp, referred to as "DaDa". When she meets the Mr. Sloane sunbathing on a tombstone in the cemetery near her home, she invites him to become a lodger. Soon after he accepts her offer, Kath seduces him. Her closeted brother Ed makes him the chauffeur, complete with a tight leather uniform, of his pink 1959 Pontiac Parisienne convertible. Kemp recognizes Mr. Sloane as the man who killed his boss years before, and stabs him in the leg with a gardening tool.

Mr. Sloane takes delight in playing brother against sister and tormenting the elderly man. He gets Kath pregnant and a jealous Ed warns him to stay away from her. When Mr. Sloane murders Kemp to protect his secret, they blackmail him by threatening to report him to the police, unless he agrees to participate in a ménage à trois in which he becomes not only a sexual partner but their prisoner as well.

Cast
Beryl Reid: Kath
Peter McEnery: Sloane
Harry Andrews:  Ed
Alan Webb: Kemp

Production
Douglas Hickox was a TV director who wanted to get into feature films. He discovered the rights to the play were available and set up a company with Doug Kentish from Illustra. They spent two years trying to raise finance.
Hickox admitted "Orton is not a subject I would have picked" normally but "it was my opportunity."

The 1959 Pontiac Parisienne, registration number VYP 74, used to belong to original Pink Floyd member Syd Barrett, and was in pretty poor shape. Photographer Mick Rock, who did famous shots of the musician with his car, remembers: "If I recall correctly, it was a Pontiac Parisienne, a push-button convertible, and it was pink. Mickey Finn, who became the bongo-player for T. Rex, had picked it up at an auction, and Syd had swopped his Mini for it. But he didn’t have a clue how to drive this massive American car, and it basically didn’t work anyway. You can see the back wheel is a bit wonky. Eventually, it got towed. It was autumn 1969…" The car had been repainted dark blue by either Finn or Barrett, but for the sake of the movie it was painted bright pink again, and given extra accessories like chrome front lights, but a close look shows it was more of a cover-up job than an actual restoration. It is unclear how the car ended up in the movie, but obviously it never had been towed away and was ready when the filming began in August.

Filming

The film was produced at Intertel Studios in Wembley and on location at Brockley, at East Dulwich, and at the lodge in Camberwell Old Cemetery in Honor Oak.   The crew asked for dressing rooms at Marmora Road, opposite the cemetery, but Reid refused to "lower herself" to use an ordinary house as her dressing room, so a caravan had to be especially arranged for her and parked in the street outside.

Music
The theme song was sung by Georgie Fame. Fame released it as the B-side of his 1970 single "Somebody Stole My Thunder".

Release
Attended by Princess Margaret, the Royal World Premiere took place on 1 April 1970 at the Carlton Cinema in London.

Critical reception
Roger Greenspun of The New York Times observed, "I think that the play's real interest lies precisely in its grotesque avoidance of the depths with which the movie is so vividly familiar. But in most of its particulars the film succeeds—with a superb cast, Douglas Hickox's inventive and generally restrained direction, and a screenplay by Clive Exton that . . . opens up the action mainly to enlarge the characterization of Ed, a real virtue if only for allowing more time and scope to the wonderful Harry Andrews. To a degree the drama has been realized on film . . . and this seems worth the effort and the occasional misdirections, and the nervous discomfort that is likely to be an audience's most immediate response."

Time Out thought the original play "loses much of its savoury charm in this movie version. Clive Exton's script opens out the play conventionally, to little effect, and Hickox's direction shows little flair for farce in general or Orton in particular."

Veteran actor Dudley Sutton originated the role of Sloane in the premiere London and New York stage productions, and was friends with Orton. He was sharply critical of the film version in a 2016 YouTube video interview with Dr Emma Parker of the University of Leicester (see external links) and he complained strongly about what he saw as the film's weak presentation of Sloane's character:

"The thing about Sloane is that he's ... lumpen ... he's not a lightweight. When they made that atrocious film ... God rest 'em ... they made Sloane a lightweight, and he isn't like that. Sloane is kind of monosyllabic, and he's heavy, he's lumpen ... leaden ... he's a geez."

DVD release
The film was released on DVD by Cinema Club on 20 June 2005.

References

External links

 
British Film Institute database
 "Entertaining Mr Sloane – Dudley Sutton" – YouTube video interview with actor Dudley Sutton, conducted by Dr Emma Parker, University of Leicester, published 8 June 2016 (relevant comments commence at 1:20 into interview).

1970 films
1970s black comedy films
1971 comedy-drama films
1971 films
1970 LGBT-related films
Bisexuality-related films
British black comedy films
British comedy-drama films
British LGBT-related films
1970s English-language films
Films about dysfunctional families
Films about siblings
British films based on plays
Films directed by Douglas Hickox
Films shot in London
LGBT-related black comedy films
LGBT-related comedy-drama films
Murder in films
British pregnancy films
1970 comedy films
1970 drama films
Films with screenplays by Clive Exton
1970s British films